
Gmina Radłów is an urban-rural gmina (administrative district) in Tarnów County, Lesser Poland Voivodeship, in southern Poland.

Villages
Apart from the town of Radłów, Gmina Radłów contains the villages and settlements of Biskupice Radłowskie, Brzeźnica, Glów, Łęka Siedlecka, Marcinkowice, Niwka, Przybysławice, Sanoka, Siedlec, Wał-Ruda, Wola Radłowska, Zabawa and Zdrochec.

Neighbouring gminas
Gmina Radłów is bordered by the gminas of Borzęcin, Szczurowa, Wierzchosławice, Wietrzychowice and Żabno.

References
Polish official population figures 2006

Radlow
Tarnów County